Silo is a genus of caddisflies in the family Goeridae. There are about 11 described species in Silo.

Species
 Silo alupkensis Martynov, 1917
 Silo chrisiammos Malicky, 1984
 Silo duplex Hagen, 1964
 Silo graellsii Pictet, 1865
 Silo mediterraneus McLachlan, 1884
 Silo nigricornis (Pictet, 1834)
 Silo pallipes (Fabricius, 1781)
 Silo piceus (Brauer, 1857)
 Silo proximus Martynov, 1913
 Silo rufescens (Rambur, 1842)
 Silo tuberculatus Martynov, 1909

References

Further reading

 
 
 
 

Trichoptera genera
Integripalpia